The Jacksons Story, a greatest hits album released on Hip-O Select/UTV Records on July 20, 2004 and later re-released on August 28, 2007, covers fourteen years of hit singles scored by the American R&B family group The Jackson 5/Jacksons between 1969 and 1982. It not only covers the quintet's early years as the princes of Motown during the late 1960s and early 1970s and their disco innovations in the mid-1970s while still at Motown (1974), but also their later funk/disco period while recording for CBS Records and its two divisions: Philadelphia International (1976–1977) and Epic (1977–1981) during the late 1970s and early 1980s. For further historical value, the collection also includes solo hit singles by the sole two Jackson brothers who scored solo success, Jermaine's 1979 smash "Let's Get Serious" and Michael's hits spanning from 1971's "Got to Be There", 1972's "Rockin' Robin" and "Ben", 1979's "Don't Stop 'Til You Get Enough" and 1983's "Billie Jean".

Track listing 

2004 greatest hits albums
The Jackson 5 compilation albums
Hip-O Records compilation albums